Andrew Widick (March 27, 1842 – January 24, 1929) was an American Medal of Honor recipient who fought in the American Civil War.

Biography 
Andrew Widick was born on March 27, 1842, in Macon County, Illinois. He joined the 116th Illinois Infantry Regiment and fought as a private during the war. He earned his Medal of Honor at the Battle of Vicksburg, Mississippi, on May 22, 1863. He died January 24, 1929, in Bertrand, Nebraska, and is now buried there in Highland Cemetery.

Medal of Honor Citation 
For gallantry in the charge of the volunteer storming party on 22 May 1863, in action at Vicksburg, Mississippi.

References 

1842 births
1929 deaths
Union Army soldiers
United States Army Medal of Honor recipients
American Civil War recipients of the Medal of Honor